"Dans la main d'un magicien" (meaning "In the Hand of a Magic Man") is Celine Dion's first single from the movie soundtrack Opération beurre de pinottes. It was released in 1985 in Quebec, Canada. Dion recorded also an English version of this song called "Listen to the Magic Man" and did her first real music video for it (1985). "Listen to the Magic Man" is also notable for being Dion's first English-language song recorded in the studio.

Background
The Peanut Butter Solution / Opération beurre de pinottes soundtrack album includes both versions as well as two other Dion recordings: "La ballade de Michel" and its English-language counterpart "Michael's Song". Neither the French or English version of the song were included on any of Dion's albums.

The track was made officially available on a CD for the first time in September 2006. It was included on a special bonus disc bundled with Volume 1 of the Contes pour tous DVD box set, only available through Imavision's web site.

In November 2014, "Dans la main d'un magicien" and "Listen to the Magic Man" were released digitally around the world.

Track listings and formats
Canadian 7" single
"Dans la main d'un magicien" – 3:20
"CUE 17 à instrumental" (Instrumental) – 2:09

Canadian 7" single
"Listen to the Magic Man" – 3:20
"Michael's Song" – 3:00

References

Songs about wizards
1985 singles
1985 songs
Celine Dion songs
Epic Records singles
French-language songs
Song recordings produced by Eddy Marnay
Songs written by Eddy Marnay
Songs written by Lewis Furey